George Houston Burr (20 or 29 May 1881 – 30 September 1958), also known as G. Houston Burr or Houston Burr, was an American architect primarily active in Boston, Massachusetts, and the surrounding area from at least 1910 into the 1950s. From 1920 onward Burr was partnered with fellow architect James E. McLaughlin, who had previously designed Fenway Park, the home stadium of the Boston Red Sox baseball team. Their architectural firm was called McLaughlin and Burr.

Early life
Burr was born on 20 May 1881 or 29 May 1881 in Maryland. His father Shields Burr (1853–1883) was born in Washington, D.C., and died in Topolobampo, Mexico, of yellow fever and was buried at sea in that city's harbor. Two cenotaphs for Shields Burr exist: one at Oak Hill Cemetery in Washington, D.C., and another at Rome Cemetery in Rome, Maine. Burr's mother was Clara Nye Burr (1856–1907), who was born in Rome, Maine, and died in Natick, Massachusetts; she is buried alongside her husband's cenotaph in Oak Hill Cemetery. George Houston Burr may have been born or spent his early life in Laurel, Maryland, as a memorial service for his father was held at St. Philip's Episcopal Church in Laurel on 19 October 1883. He had a younger brother also named Shields Burr (1883–1960).

Burr married Regina Muriel Robinson (1885–1981) of New Jersey in 1908 or 1909. Her parents were Harry and Regina Robinson. George and Regina had three children together: Muriel Burr (1913–1998), Hugh Burr (1915–1997), and Margaret Robinson Burr (1918–1998).

Professional career
Burr graduated from Cornell University College of Architecture in 1905 and was working as a draftsman by 1910. In 1912 he became an architect and partnered with fellow architect Frank T. Lent; their office was located in Leominster, Massachusetts. Burr moved to Cambridge, Massachusetts, a year later in 1913 and began working in the office of architect James E. McLaughlin in 1914. Apparently Burr was initially demoted back to draftsman in McLaughlin's office, although by 1915 he was again going by the title "architect." In 1920 the two men formed a partnership under the name McLaughlin and Burr. The architectural firm of McLaughlin and Burr remained active into the 1950s, designing multiple residential, commercial, and public buildings (including many schools) throughout Massachusetts. Burr was a member of the American Institute of Architects from 1921 to 1942.

Later life
Burr died on 30 September 1958 in Belmont, Massachusetts. He is buried at Mount Auburn Cemetery in Cambridge, Massachusetts.

Works
This is a partial list.

As McLaughlin and Burr
65 Commonwealth Avenue, Boston
Boston Latin School, Boston
Dorchester High School, Dorchester
Hotel Bradford (former Elks Hotel), Boston
Mary E. Curley School, Jamaica Plain
South Boston Police Station (District 6), Boston
Temple Israel Meeting House, Boston

References

1881 births
1958 deaths
Architects from Massachusetts
Architects from Maryland
Architects from Boston
20th-century American architects
Cornell University alumni